This page shows the main events during the 2005 year in the sport of athletics throughout the world.

Major events

World

 World Championships
 World Athletics Final
 World Cross Country Championships
 World Half Marathon Championships
 World Youth Championships
 World Student Games
 Golden League

Regional

 African Junior Championships
 Bolivarian Games
 Central American and Caribbean Championships
 South American Championships
 Jeux de la Francophonie
 European Indoor Championships
 European U23 Championships
 European Junior Championships
 European Cup
 European Cross Country Championships
 European Mountain Running Championships
 European Race Walking Cup
 Balkan Games
 Mediterranean Games
 Asian Championships
 Asian Indoor Games
 Central Asian Games
 East Asian Games
 Islamic Solidarity Games
 Southeast Asian Games
 West Asian Games

National
2005 Chinese National Games

World records

Men

Women

Awards

Men

Women

Season's best performances

Men

400 m hurdles

3000 m steeplechase

Pole vault

Hammer throw

Decathlon

Women

100 metres

200 metres

400 metres

800 metres

1500 metres

3000 metres

5000 metres

10,000 metres

Half marathon

100 m hurdles

400 m hurdles

3000 m steeplechase

High jump

Pole vault

Hammer throw

Heptathlon

Marathon

Men's competition

Best Year Performances

Women's competition

Best Year Performances

 Saint Silvester Marathon

Deaths
May 27 — Piotr Gładki (33), Polish long-distance runner (b. 1972)

References
 ARRS

 
Athletics (track and field) by year